The Day Before is an upcoming multiplayer open world survival horror video game developed by Fntastic and published by Mytona.

Plot 
Set in a post-apocalyptic version of the United States, the world has been overrun by zombies after a pandemic.

Development 
The Day Before was first revealed in 2021 with a "gameplay" trailer that showed the basic mechanics of the game. The game was originally supposed to be released in June 2022, but was delayed to March 1, 2023 due to a planned switch from Unreal Engine 4 to Unreal Engine 5.

In January 2023, the page for The Day Before was pulled from Steam, with Fntastic stating on January 25 that there had been trademark issues surrounding the title of the game, and announcing that the release had been further delayed to November 10, 2023 for this reason. However, the studio's founders later told IGN that the delay had already been planned prior to them learning of the trademark disputes, and was to be announced via a new ten-minute gameplay trailer. They also defended claims that the game was a "scam", stating that they were being backed by Mytona and being evaluated on their progress regularly, and that "we didn't take a penny from people: no crowdfunding, no pre-orders, no donations". 

On February 2, 2023, amid speculation over the status of the game, Fntastic released the new raw gameplay footage. However, shortly afterward, videos relating to The Day Before were pulled from YouTube due to trademark complaints by a third-party. Fntastic later claimed that it was being targeted by the developer of a calendar app named "TheDayBefore".

Reception 
Prior to being removed off Steam, the game was one of the most wishlisted on the platform.

See also
Propnight, Fntastic's previous game

References

External links
 

Upcoming video games scheduled for 2023
2020s horror video games
Post-apocalyptic video games
Third-person shooters
Video games about zombies
Video games developed in Russia
Windows games
Windows-only games